The 1968 United States presidential election in Vermont  took place on November 5, 1968, as part of the 1968 United States presidential election which was held throughout all 50 states and the District of Columbia. Voters chose three representatives, or electors to the Electoral College, who voted for president and vice president.

Vermont was won by the Republican nominee, former Vice President Richard Nixon of California, and his running mate Governor Spiro Agnew of Maryland, defeating incumbent Democratic Vice President Hubert H. Humphrey of Minnesota and his running mate Senator Edmund Muskie of Maine.

Nixon took 52.75% of the vote to Humphrey’s 43.53%, a margin of 9.22%.

The American Independent candidate, Southern populist Governor George Wallace of Alabama, did not have a serious impact on the race. While taking 13.53% nationally and winning electoral votes from 5 Southern states, Wallace would take only 3.16% of the vote in Vermont. Wallace's base of support was in the South, and he had practically no appeal in Northeastern states like Vermont, which would be Wallace’s third weakest state in the nation after Hawaii and Maine.

Vermont historically was a bastion of liberal Northeastern Republicanism, and by 1968 the Green Mountain State had gone Republican in every presidential election since the founding of the Republican Party, except in the Democratic landslide of 1964, when the GOP had nominated staunch conservative Barry Goldwater. Goldwater had lost the 1964 election in a nationwide landslide, but the loss in Vermont was especially severe from a historical perspective. From 1856 to 1960, Vermont had the longest streak of voting Republican of any state, having never voted Democratic before, but in 1964 it rejected Goldwater's conservatism and went Democratic for the first time – and by a landslide 66-33 margin.

In 1968, the GOP sought to recover from their crippling defeat with Goldwater, and the party looked to former Vice President and the party’s narrowly defeated 1960 presidential nominee, Richard Nixon. Nixon was seen as a mainstream moderate Republican who could unite the competing factions of the Republican Party, and win back the moderate voters that Goldwater had alienated. The party recovered successfully and won back the White House, Vermont was returned to the Republican column, and Nixon’s 1968 victory in Vermont established another twenty year winning streak for the GOP in the state. The state would finally flip to the Democrats for good in 1992 after the GOP again embraced a more conservative  stance in the 1980s.

As Nixon won a razor-thin victory over Humphrey nationally, Vermont weighed in as about 8% more Republican than the nation. However, with the four other New England states voting for Humphrey, Vermont became one of the two states in the region (the other being neighboring New Hampshire) to vote for Nixon. As of 2020, this is the last election in which Vermont voted more Republican than New Hampshire.

Nixon won 12 of the 14  counties in Vermont, losing only 2 counties in the northwestern part of the state. Humphrey won Chittenden County, the most populous county, home to the state's largest city, Burlington, as well as Franklin County. The northwestern 3 counties of Vermont had long been Democratic enclaves in an otherwise Republican state, although in 1968 Nixon was able to win a plurality in tiny Grand Isle County.

Richard Nixon had previously won the Green Mountain State again against John F. Kennedy in 1960 and then would win it again against George McGovern in 1972.

Results

Results by county

See also
 United States presidential elections in Vermont

Notes

References

Vermont
1968
1968 Vermont elections